Ravivarman Sharmila, best known as R. Sharmila (A Hindu Seli Dravida-Schedule Caste) is an Indian national carrom champion with excellent skill and control on the game. She born on 23 April 1981 to a lower-income family in Chennai. She started playing at 8 years of age and developed her game enough to be selected for the 1992 Tamil Nadu Sub-Junior Carrom Team at age 11.

Championships
 Winner 19th Sub-Junior National in the year 1993 (Doubles)
 Winner 21st Sub-Junior National in the year 1995, Delhi (Singles)
 Winner Senior National in 1998, 1999, 2000
 Won 3 Federation Cup Singles titles
 She brought laurels for the country, being a member of the Indian Carrom Team which defeated Sri Lanka by 3-0 in the Independence Cup Indo-Sri Lanka Test Series, held in Sri Lanka, 1998-99.

References
 

Tamil sportspeople
Living people
Indian carrom players
Game players from Tamil Nadu
Sportswomen from Tamil Nadu
Year of birth missing (living people)